Lecchese is a dialect of Western Lombard language spoken in the city and suburbs of Lecco (Lombardy).

Characteristics 
It has the characteristic, in contrast with the other Comasco-Lecchese dialects, to be influenced by Brianzöö, Valsassinese, Valtellinese and Bergamasque (an Eastern Lombard variety spoken in and around the city of Bergamo).

Grammar 

In the use of vergót (coming from Eastern Lombard) instead of Comasco quajcòss (="something"). Another characteristic is the presence of close "e" instead of "i", and of close "o" instead of "u"; the use of suffixes "-om", "-on" instead of "-amm", "-ã"; the use of suffix "-én" instead of "-ĩ"; the use of article "ul".

See also 
 Lombard language

Bibliography 
 Andrea Rognoni, Grammatica dei dialetti della Lombardia, Oscar Mondadori, 2005.
 Amanzio Aondio - Felice Bassani, Passato da ricordare, Cattaneo Editore Oggiono - Lecco, 1990.

Western Lombard language